Giustina Levi-Perotti of Sassoferrato was the (likely fictitious) 14th-century Jewish author of two Petrarchan sonnets.

It was republished by Giacomo Filippo Tomasini (Petrarca Redivivus, 1635), who attributed it to Giustina. Subsequently it was included in various collections of poetry, down to 1885. Although Crescimbeni, Tiraboschi, and Zeno doubted the authenticity of the sonnet, scholars like Quadrio and, with some hesitation, Foscolo accepted it.  and later literary critics concluded that the sonnet is the work of a 16th-century writer, and that Giustina Levi-Perotti never existed.

References
 

Fictional poets
Fictional Jewish women
Fictional Italian Jews
Fictional female poets
Petrarch
People whose existence is disputed